The 1897 Middleton by-election was held on 4 November 1897 after the incumbent Conservative MP Thomas Fielden died.  The seat was narrowly gained by the Liberal candidate James Duckworth, who would lose the seat at the next general election in 1900.

References 

By-elections to the Parliament of the United Kingdom in Lancashire constituencies
1897 elections in the United Kingdom